Edith Lewis (December 22, 1882 – August 11, 1972) was a magazine editor at McClure's Magazine, the managing editor of Every Week Magazine, and an advertising copywriter at J. Walter Thompson. Lewis was Willa Cather's domestic partner and was named executor of Cather's literary estate in Cather's will. After  Cather's death, Lewis published a memoir of Cather in 1953 titled Willa Cather Living.

Early life 
Lewis graduated from Smith College in 1902.  Following her graduation, she relocated to her hometown, Lincoln, Nebraska, to teach for a year.  While in Lincoln, she met Willa Cather for the first time at the home of the publisher of the Lincoln Courier, Sarah Harris.

Career 
Although historically scholars concerning Lewis in the context of Willa Cather's career have painted her as a mere copy editor or secretary, recent work has indicated that Lewis had a rich editorial and professional career that had a significant impact upon Cather's creative process. 

According to scholar Melissa Homestead, Lewis shaped Cather's prose alongside one another in a sort of "parallel silent activity in domestic space". At times, their collective editing of a single copy of a work, including written comments, became "so intertwined they are nearly inseparable." Although Cather never dedicated her writing to Lewis, there is an apparent shared ownership between the two of them, informed by their domestic and emotional relationship to one another. Homestead additionally argues that it is time for scholars to "unlock the garret door in our scholarly imaginations to let in the woman with whom (rather than for whom) Cather wrote her fiction."

Personal life 
Lewis shared a home with Willa Cather in New York City for almost 40 years.  When Lewis acquired a summer cottage on the island of Grand Manan in New Brunswick, Canada, in 1926, the two shared a summer home there.

Lewis died on August 11, 1972. She is buried beside Cather in Jaffrey, New Hampshire.

Works

References 

American magazine editors
1882 births
1972 deaths
Women magazine editors
American women journalists
20th-century American journalists
Journalists from Nebraska
People from Lincoln, Nebraska
Smith College alumni
Willa Cather
American LGBT writers
LGBT people from Nebraska